Abdol Rahim (also Romanized as Abdol Rahīm; also known as ‘Abd or Raḩīm, ‘Abdul Rahīm, and Deh-e ‘Abd or Raḩīm) is a village in Shur Dasht Rural District, Shara District, Hamadan County, Hamadan Province, Iran. At the 2006 census, its population was 2,156, in 534 families.

References 

Populated places in Hamadan County